Henry Beckett Whitta (2 March 1883 – 11 July 1944) played first-class cricket for Canterbury from 1904 to 1919, and played for New Zealand in the days before New Zealand played Test cricket.

"A dashing batsman of short stature, and an excellent point fieldsman", Whitta had his best season in 1913-14, when he captained Canterbury and was the leading batsman in the Plunket Shield, scoring 333 runs in four matches at an average of 47.57. Opening the batting, he scored 147 (in 260 minutes) and 41 in the 318-run victory over Auckland. Canterbury won all four matches easily. He was selected to open the batting in New Zealand's first match against the touring Australians later that season, and scored 12 and 53 (in 63 minutes) but New Zealand lost and he was one of seven players omitted for the second match. Whitta was also the leading batsman in the Christchurch competition that season, with 745 runs at 106.42 for his club Riccarton, who were defeated in the final.

He later served as a Test selector.

References

External links
 Henry Whitta at CricketArchive

1883 births
1944 deaths
New Zealand cricketers
Pre-1930 New Zealand representative cricketers
Canterbury cricketers
Cricketers from Christchurch